David Hoffman may refer to:

 David Hoffman (jurist) (1784–1854), American jurist
David Allen Hoffman, American mathematician
 David E. Hoffman (born 1953), American writer and journalist 
David Francis Hoffman (born 1946), American criminal 
 David H. Hoffman (born 1967), former federal prosecutor
 David Lee Hoffman, American importer and inventor
 David M. Hoffman (born 1945), American author, political commentator and media activist

See also
 David Hofman (1908–2003), British Bahá'ís faith leader
 David Hoffmann (disambiguation)